Castelo de Trancoso is a castle in Portugal. It is classified as a National Monument.

Trancoso
Castle Trancoso
Trancoso